The 1980 Lliga Catalana de Bàsquet was the first edition of the Catalan Basketball League. It was contested by six teams, and it run from September 13, 1980, to November 26, 1980.

Regular season

Standings

Results

Final

References

Lliga Catalana de Bàsquet seasons
 
Spanish